Graveyard Peak is an 11,539-foot-elevation (3,517 meter) mountain summit located in the Sierra Nevada mountain range in Fresno County of northern California, United States. It is situated in the John Muir Wilderness, on land managed by Sierra National Forest. The peak is set on Silver Divide, so precipitation runoff from the north side of this mountain drains into Fish Creek which is a tributary of the San Joaquin River, and from the south slope to Lake Thomas A Edison.

History

Graveyard Peak and Graveyard Lakes are named in association with nearby Graveyard Meadows which in turn was named for two sheepmen who were murdered and buried there. This landform's toponym has been officially adopted by the U.S. Board on Geographic Names.

The first ascent of the summit was made September 8, 1935, by William Stewart and David Parish.

Climate
According to the Köppen climate classification system, Graveyard Peak is located in an alpine climate zone. Most weather fronts originate in the Pacific Ocean, and travel east toward the Sierra Nevada mountains. As fronts approach, they are forced upward by the peaks (orographic lift), causing them to drop their moisture in the form of rain or snowfall onto the range.

Gallery

See also
 
 Sierra Nevada

References

External links
 Weather forecast: Graveyard Peak
 Graveyard Peak (photo): Flickr

Sierra National Forest
Mountains of Fresno County, California
Mountains of the John Muir Wilderness
North American 3000 m summits
Mountains of Northern California
Sierra Nevada (United States)